The Bay State Street Railway Company  was a horse-drawn and electric streetcar railroad operated on the streets of Boston, Massachusetts and communities directly north (stretching into New Hampshire) and south (extending into Rhode Island) of the city. Its immediate successor was the Eastern Massachusetts Street Railway, and its modern successor is the state-run Massachusetts Bay Transportation Authority (MBTA).

History
The Bay State Street Railway Company (Bay State) was formed out of the merger of the Boston and Northern Street Railway (B&N), operating north of Boston, and the Old Colony Street Railway (OC), operating south of Boston. On December 12, 1917, the Bay State went into receivership. The Bay State was acquired by Eastern Massachusetts Street Railway Company on January 15, 1919.

Constituent companies

Old Colony Street Railway Company

The Old Colony began operations on July 5, 1881 as the Brockton Street Railway Company The corporate name of the company was changed to Old Colony on February 7, 1901.

Boston and Northern Street Railroad Company

The B&N was chartered April 6, 1859 by Special Act of Legislature (chapter 202, Acts of 1859) as the Lynn and Boston Railroad Company (L&B), renamed July 23, 1901 to the Boston and Northern Street Railway Company (B&N) under authority of Chapter 360, Acts of 1891.

Divisions

The Bay State had 16 divisions:
 NORTH
 Chelsea (214 Broadway)
 Gloucester (100 Main Street)
 Haverhill (3 Water Street)
 Salem (237 Essex Street)
 Lawrence (586 Essex Street)
 Lowell (5 Merrimack Square)
 Lynn (333 Union Street)
 Nashua (150 Main Street)
 Wakefield (Reading Square)
 Woburn (North Warren Street, Woburn Center)
 SOUTH
 Brockton (87 Main Street)
 Fall River (794 North Main Street)
 Hyde Park (435 Hyde Park Avenue)
 Newport (Vernon Avenue)
 Quincy (Hancock Street)
 Taunton (20 Winthrop Street)

References

Streetcars in the Boston area
Interurban railways in Massachusetts
Defunct Massachusetts railroads
Public transportation in the Boston area
Tram, urban railway and trolley companies
Defunct companies based in Massachusetts
1911 establishments in Massachusetts
Railway companies disestablished in 1919
Railway companies established in 1911
Transportation in Suffolk County, Massachusetts
American companies established in 1911
Rail transportation in Boston